Archaeology of Kosovo as a field of study and research was started in the second half of the 20th century. Kosovo's field of archaeology has developed in tandem with the historical study, studies of ancient authors' sources, classic philological studies, theological data research, topographic studies and ground survey, analysis of toponyms, deciphering of epigraphic and historiographic data. First data about antique monuments in Kosovo, were documented from the end of the 19th until the beginning of the Second World War, a time period when Kosovo was visited by  researchers, guides, and archaeologists such as: Evans, Boue, Hahn, Kanitz, Tomaschek, Domaschevski, Arpad, Vulic, Jirecek, Patsch, Domenico Mustilli,     etc.

In the 1950s, a new era for the ancient studies of Kosovo begins, with prehistoric and antiquity research. Proper development of scientific archaeological research methods starts with the founding of the Museum of Kosovo in 1949, and later these studies are made helped with the establishment of other relevant local and regional institutions. In 2003, Ministry of Culture, Youth and Sports of Kosovo establishes the Archaeological Institute of Kosovo, and since then, continually, besides informative campaigns in field,  many archaeological sites were excavated and recorded. Since then geophysical, geomagnetic archaeometallurgical and archaeobotanic studies were performed at some archaeological sites in close cooperation with partners from Germany such as the German Archaeological Institute, and other relevant international institutions with the same inter-disciplinary access. The municipality of Ferizaj specifically has been rich in archaeological findings.

Pre-Neolithic

The favorable Geo-strategic position as well as abundant natural resources were ideal for the development of life since the prehistoric periods, proven by hundreds of archaeological sites discovered and identified throughout Kosovo, which proudly present its rich archeological heritage.
The number of sites with archaeological potential is increasing, this as a result of findings and investigations that are carried out throughout Kosovo but also from many superficial traces which offer a new overview of antiquity of Kosovo. 
The earliest traces documented in the territory of Kosovo belong to the Stone Age Period, namely there are indications that cave dwellings might have existed like for example the Radivojce Cave set near the spring of the Drin river, then there are some indications at Grnčar Cave in the Vitia municipality, Dema and Karamakaz Caves of Peja etc. However, life during the Paleolithic or Old Stone Age is not confirmed yet and not scientifically proven. Therefore, until arguments of Paleolithic and Mesolithic man are confirmed, Neolithic man, respectively the Neolithic sites are considered as the chronological beginning of population in Kosovo. From this period until today Kosovo has been inhabited, and traces of activities of societies from prehistoric, ancient and up to medieval time are visible throughout its territory. Whereas, in some archaeological sites, multilayer settlements clearly reflect the continuity of life through centuries.

Neolithic (c. 6500-3500 BC)

The warm and humid climate of the Holocene that came soon after the last Ice Age, brought changes in the nature, which were reflected in humans as well as in the flora and fauna of the general living environment. This climatic stabilization influenced changes in the human's life and activities. The human society from now is characterized by the changes in community organization and especially in the establishment of permanent settlements, set in dry places, near the river shores and on fertile plateaus.
 
Neolithic man now mastered stone and tooled weapons, tools and even used stone for the primitive architecture. The main cultural characteristics of the new stone age (Neolithic), are primarily based on the archaeological documentation, and the most present material are
stone modeled materials, therefore we know this period as New Stone Age or Neolithic civilization (Neo-new, Lithos-stone). During this period major changes occur, thus influencing the way of living, from a lifestyle of hunting and gathering to agriculture and settlement. 
During this period, which can be attributed to the domestication
of animals and very important the pottery production emerged with other supporting professions that lead to the development and prosperity of the human civilization.

The Neolithic man now leaves hunting and gathering as the primary profession, which influenced new way of living, from nomadic to semi nomadic living. Moreover, the crop cultivation was the main economical activity, and the work on the land is done using the stone, animal bone/horn and wooden materials. During this period, the role of the woman shifts to the first plan, mostly involved in creation of clothing, pottery production, taking care for the living space and children, food preparation and small animal domestication. All previously mentioned work is done by the Neolithic woman.
Anthropomorphic figurines discovered all around the world as well as in our country prove this argument whereas in most cases, the human modeled figurines were created in the schematic shape in most of the cases present female bodies.

The main economical sources of the Neolithic period were; agriculture, manufacturing tools, weapons and pottery, domestication and animal breeding, farming, (pastoral economy) and to a smaller portion hunting and fishing. Therefore, the settlements were erected near the natural resources. The majority of Neolithic sites that were researched in our country shed light on the fact that dwellings were built with the usage of circumstantial materials found near the settlements. Neolithic settlements where in most cases constructed of built huts with wooden
frames and sticks, coated with soil and mixed with oaten chaff, while roofs of the huts were constructed with inter twisted cane and rye chaff.

Even though among archaeologists and academics there are different perceptions regarding the time span and Neolithic dating, it can be argued that the time frame 6500-3500 BC should be regarded as the relative real extent of the Neolithic period in the Balkans. 

The cave and rock art is proved in our country confirming the usage of caves as temporary shelters for defense, but also as the prehistoric cult places, for the worship of gods of the polytheistic pagan world. The main cult was attributed to the mother goddess. This is an undisputed proof that mother (woman) figure takes an important place since
she runs the house, takes care of the family, is involved in the process of cultural and economic development as well as social organization of the family. Such position of Neolithic woman is also known as the period of matriarchate which is a distinguished feature of Neolithic period.

Copper Age (c. 3500-2500 BC)

The metal period incorporates a long stretched timeline of over three millenniums, commencing from approximately 3500 BC up to middle of the 4th century BC. During the gradual evolution of the human society, from the usage of stone, the man advances to the usage of metals, namely, commencing primarily with the usage of copper since the second part of the fourth millennium BC. In fact, the new period is known as the Copper Age and chronologically commences with the end of the Neolithic Period. Nevertheless, the Copper Age in the archaeological jargon is known as the Neolithic Period (eneus-copper and lithos-stone) or Calcolithic, therefore, the binom Copper Age and Eneolithic mean the same distinguished metal emerging period, after the Neolithic and before the Bronze Age.

In the chronological history of the territory of Kosovo, this timeline incorporates approximately the period from 3500 up to 2500 BC. In our country, several archaeological sites of this particular transitory period from stone to metal usage have been recorded. Amid the most important copper age sites are, the multi-layer site of Hisar in Suva Reka (Albanian: Therandë) and the multi-layer fortified settlement of Gornje Gadimlje, in the municipality of Lipljan.

Furthermore, this transitory period is distinguished especially for some changes and developments within the Copper Age society, among the most important ones to mention here are; the transformation of the society regulation from a matriarchal to a patriarchal organized society, but also, beginning of the separation of social classes, respectively, social differentiation within the society, makes this period different and particular from earlier and later periods.

Bronze Age (c. 2500-1100 BC)

The Bronze Age followed the Copper Age, stretching in the time period from 2500 up to 1100 BC. With the advancement of the metallurgy factorial industry, and with the mixing of copper with tin, the bronze was created as an alloy. The formula invention for creating this stronger metal, leads towards the preparation and production of weapons, tools and jewelry. The particularity of this period lies in the fact that matriarchate is replaced with patriarchate, the social differentiation was developed and the first elements of tribal aristocracy emerges. All new changes and developments are reflected in the material culture discovered in various sites across Kosovo. During the past research carried out in Kosovo, dozens of settlements, cemeteries and fortresses of the early, middle and late Bronze Age were recorded.

Iron Age (c. 1100 - mid-4th century BC)

Besides the exploitation of the metals for the massive production of weapons and to some extent the working tools for agriculture, the Iron Age evidenced in Kosovo is well presented with lowland settlements but also with upland fortresses, often protected by traverses and ditches or drywalls. Regarding the fortifications, the Iron Age is characteristic for the erected fortresses on the top of the hills, with good Geo-strategic positions, partially protected by nature. Nevertheless, the identification ‘stamp’ of the Iron Age as documented, recorded and studied in Kosovo, are the burial mounds, or locally known as the tumulus graves, and quite dispersed all around Kosovo, counting maybe hundreds and either set in groups or even as solitary tumulus.

Roman Period

The Roman period includes the time frame of first four centuries of the 1st millennium AD. In the 1st century AD, the Romans set their administrative-military system, whereas they extended the slave-owner system upon production, which caused discord in relation to the local population. With this, a new gradual or step by step process of Romanization commenced which in fact was only a partial one and did not really change the ethnic structure of the indigenous Dardanian population.

With the implementation of the agrarian policies imposed by the Roman rulers, the “ager provincialis” and “ager publicus”, became the property of the Roman state. Nevertheless, part of the local administration and political power remained with the locals, all the while central government was respected and their orders obeyed. The new tax collection was set by the new rulers and different obligations were paid by the population, among the taxes, particular taxes were the tributum soli and tributum capiti. During the first two centuries of the Roman administration of Dardania, the Roman rulers followed an expansive and repressive policy toward the autochthonous population, using the indigenous people as slaves and labor force in the rich mining areas, but also in farming and agriculture. On the other hand, the italic veterans gained large estates of lands, fertile areas and were encouraged to get as much slaves needed for the hard work. 

Nevertheless, the Roman Peace (Pax Romana) established during the reign of the Augustus, created conditions for new economical developments and spread of the Roman civilization in conquered provinces. With the fall of the Dardanian Kingdom under the Roman rule and administration, the Dardanian territory became part of a new established Roman Province of Moesia, which according to the written sources happened between the year 2 and 6 BC. In the year 86 AD, at the time of the rule of the Emperor Domitian (81-96 AD), Dardania became part of a new province known as the Roman Province of the Upper Moesia (Moesia Superior). At all events, the historic year of 297 AD, was a very significant year for Dardania and the Dardanians, since, this year marked the creation of the Roman Province of Dardania, a self administrated province, though, within the frame of the Roman Empire. Despite the existence of the urban centers for example; Scupi, Ulpiana, Naissus, Municipium Dardanorum, etc., the Romanization of Dardania was cursory and superficial, this is also documented through the existence of Dardanian forts and towns, during the entire period of the Roman rule.

Since the second part of the 19th century and until the beginning of the Second World War, different  travelers–writers like; Ami Boue, Gilfierding, Hahn, MaKenzie, Yrbi, Domaschevski, Premestein, Jastrebov, Vulic, Truhelka, Boskovic, Kaniz, Tomaschek, Jiricek, Patsch, Saria, etc., visited these parts mainly investigating and recording the Roman antiquity of the Kosovo territory.

Worth mentioning is the British scholar Sir Artur John Evans, who during his visits in the central Balkans (1875) recorded in his notes, some very precious data regarding the Roman era in Kosovo. Furthermore, Evans, was the first author to pinpoint to the Roman town of the Municipium DD (Dardanorum) situated not far from Kosovska Mitrovica and also recorded some relevant data for several other archaeological sites or centers, for example; archaeological site of Banjica at Runjeva, Kačanik and Đeneral Janković.

There is no doubt that the Roman rule brought major changes in the lands inhabited by the Dardanians; they were responsible also for the urbanization of the region, but also about social, cultural, economical and religious changes influenced by the Romans, which was documented thoroughly by the Kosovar pioneer of archaeology, the scientific hard worker of the Kosovo Museum, now late Dr. Emil Čerškov.

Late Antiquity and Medieval Period

The Late Antique Period, respectively known also as the Early Byzantine Period, in Kosovo marks the time frame from the rule of the Emperor Constantine the Great (306-337 AD), respectively during the 4th, 5th and 6th century AD; a time period which was perceived by historians to describe the transitory phase from antiquity to medieval. One of the most distinguished features of the Late Antiquity was the centralization of power into the emperors
hands, division of the military from civil administration, but on top of that, this period is related with the crises in ancient production system and with a decline of the Roman Empire.  In regard to this period that is between innovations and tradition, the present day territory of Kosovo,  goes through some changes, transformations and developments in economical, social, cultural, religious and political-administrative aspect, which made an impact on future evolution of this area. Furthermore, the novelty of this epoch was the consolidation of the Christianity and
the bloom of the Christian art and architecture, a characteristic for combination of tradition and innovation. Therefore, the construction architecture of this time is known by archaeologists, architects and art historians as the early Christian period architecture. On the other hand, the ancient written sources, archived church written sources, but even the oral histories in the form of myths, legends or local toponomy of the archaeological site locations, stored in the collective memory of people from different parts of the Kosovo, have offered and will provide very important data that is used in synthesised form to provide a general overview of either common or individual extraordinary rich archaeological heritage, not only for the region but even wider, including the southeast Europe. Yet, Kosovo should not be treated anymore as Terra Incognita, but contrariwise, based on the archaeological documentation, this aided by the auxiliary sciences and relevant scientific disciplines, reflect a very advanced civilization, different and even cosmopolite developments
in the ancientness. The written sources, besides tangible ones, complement the facts on the occupation and continuative presence of the autochthonous population, which was evidenced with the creation of the Dardanian Kingdom, 4th-1st century BC and later with the constitution of the Roman Province of Dardania in 297 AD; established by the Emperor Diocletian. The Late Antique period and the Early Medieval period, where a periods with an argued presence of a large number of toponomies like for example; gradishte (fortes), gradina (stronghold), kala (castle),  (tower),  (fortification), etc. Furthermore, these toponomies specifically indicate the fortified settlements set on the hills and fortified with ramparts and documented across Kosovo during the systematic archaeological surveys, reconnaissance and trial trenches, carried in the past, since the second part of the last century and continued up to the present days.

Museum of Kosovo

Kosovo Museum is the earliest institution of cultural heritage established with the goal of preserving, restoration-conservation and presentation of movable heritage on the territory. It is situated in a special facility, from an architectural point of view but also because of its location since it is situated at the old nucleus of the city centre. In fact, Kosovo museum has been operating since 1949. However, the building of the museum was constructed in 1889 and it was designed according to Austro-Hungarian style of construction and its real aim was establishing the high military command of that time.

Museum consists of three museum units such as: Kosovo Museum, Emin Gjiku’s Housing Complex where ethnological exhibition has been presented and the Museum of Independence. Museum consists of four sectors, archaeological sector, ethnological sector, historic sector and natural sector. The main museum building consists of 3 halls or galleries and one of them serves as a hall for permanent archaeological exhibitions, but various exhibits are also presented in the inner yard of the museum as well at the lapidarium, respectively in the Archaeological Park which is located next to the museum building, or on the right side of it. In the cellars of the museum, are located the warehouses of thousands of findings, artefacts and movable fragments of archaeological material, which are systematized and kept in special conditions with particular attention and care. At the end it should be emphasized that within the building of Kosovo Museum, namely on its third floor, you can find the working environment of Kosovo Archaeological Institute, a scientific-professional institution and responsible for archaeological research.

Ethnological Museum 

Ethnological Museum is an integral part of Kosovo Museum, located in the old housing complex, consisting of four buildings: two of which date from the 18th century and two others from 19th century.
The housing complex was constructed by Gjinolli family or Emin Gjiku who then migrated to Turkey in the years 1958-59. Later on, the Natural Museum was opened in this housing complex. In the year 2006 a permanent ethnological exhibition of Kosovo museum was set in this housing complex. The concept of ethnological museum is based on 4 topics which present the life cycle starting from birth, life, death and spiritual heritage of the Serbs.

The Stone house or the synagogue is also a part of the museum which during the 50s was transferred from the old part of the city of Prishtina to this housing complex. Today it serves as a centre of contemporary art – Station.

The Archaeological Park

The Archaeological Park, respectively the Lapidarium of Kosovo Museum, was designed to become an additional part of an outdoor exhibition of archaeological heritage of Kosovo. Architectural fragments, epigraphic inscriptions, altars and kennels or grave stones, that apart from mythological scenes, funeral processions, presentation of images of the past descendants supplemented with carved inscriptions, all of these reflecting upon the spiritual and material world of Dardania’s ancient period.

In fact the Archaeological Park of Kosovo museum has been designed to serve as a lapidarium, which is a predetermined place for exhibiting stone monuments and architectural fragments of an archaeological nature. Park is foreseen to serve as a memorial place for the antiquity and the level of civilisations from ancient times and also for the organisation of cultural and educational events for children and young people.

See also 
 Museum of Kosovo
 Kingdom of Dardania
 Neolithic sites in Kosovo
 Roman heritage in Kosovo
 Copper, Bronze and Iron Age sites in Kosovo

Annotations

References

Bibliography
Nicholas Marquez Grant, Linda Fibiger. "Kosovo" The Routledge Handbook of Archaeological Human Remains and Legislation, Taylor & Francis, 2011, 
 Edi Shukriu, Ancient Kosova, Ministry of Education, Science and Technology, Prishtina 2004.
 Milot Berisha. "Archaeological Guide of Kosovo", Kosovo Ministry of Culture, Youth and Sports and Archaeological Institute of Kosovo, Prishtine 2012, Print
Luan Përzhita, Kemajl Luci, Gëzim Hoxha, Adem Bunguri, Fatmir Peja, Tomor Kastrati. "Harta Arkeologjike e Kosovës vëllimi 1/ Archaeological Map of Kosovo vol.1" Akademia e Shkencave dhe e Arteve e Kosovës, Prishtinë 2006, 
Cultural Heritage Without Borders. "An Archaeological Map of the Historic Zone of Prizren", CHwB Kosovo office, Report Series No.2/2006.
Gail Warrander, Verena Knaus. "Kosovo 2nd ed." Bradt Travel Guides, 2011, 
Philip L. Kohl, Clare Fawcett, "Nationalism, Politics and the Practice of Archaeology", Cambridge University Press, 1995,

External links 

Besiana Xharra, Source: Balkan Insight, "Kosovo's Lost City Rises From Earthy Tomb", http://archaeologynewsnetwork.blogspot.com/2011/01/kosovos-lost-city-rises-from-earthy.html#.UR95dvI7owo
Tom Derrick, "Ulpiana: Digging in Kosovo" source: https://web.archive.org/web/20130308102614/http://www.trinitysaintdavid.ac.uk/en/schoolofclassics/news/name,14937,en.html
 Official Homepage of Kosovo Museum  

 
History of Kosovo